Benedikt Nikpalj (born 6 September 1993) is a Croatian bobsledder. He competed in the two-man event at the 2018 Winter Olympics.

References

External links
 

1993 births
Living people
Croatian male bobsledders
Olympic bobsledders of Croatia
Bobsledders at the 2018 Winter Olympics
Place of birth missing (living people)